Greensburg (also known as the Billikins) were an American basketball team based in Greensburg, Pennsylvania that was a member of the Central Basketball League.

Year-by-year

Defunct basketball teams in the United States
Basketball teams in Pennsylvania